Stephen Landesberg (November 23, 1936December 20, 2010) was an American actor and comedian known for his role as the erudite, unflappable police detective Arthur P. Dietrich on the ABC sitcom Barney Miller, for which he was nominated for three Emmy Awards.

Life and career
Landesberg was born on November 23, 1936, in the Bronx, New York, to Ann Landesberg, a milliner, and Abraham Landesberg, a grocery store owner. He was part of improv group New York Stickball Team, which performed several shows that aired on cable television shortly after Barney Miller went off the air.

Landesberg was a member of the cast of the 1974 CBS situation comedy Paul Sand in Friends and Lovers. He made guest appearances on The Tonight Show, The Rockford Files, Law & Order, Saturday Night Live, The Golden Girls, Ghost Whisperer, That '70s Show and Everybody Hates Chris. He starred in Starz's original show Head Case as Dr. Myron Finkelstein. He appeared in the motion pictures Wild Hogs, Leader of the Band, and Forgetting Sarah Marshall.  He appeared in 124 episodes of Barney Miller as Det. Sgt. Arthur Dietrich, starting from the last episode of the 1975 season until the end of the series in 1982.

Landesberg also co-starred in the TV pilot Black Bart, a spin-off of Blazing Saddles. He attempted a comeback to television playing a public defender in Seattle in an unsold sitcom pilot, The Best Defense, later aired on June 19, 1995, on ABC.

In the mid-1980s, Landesberg was the spokesman in TV and print advertisements for Northwestern Bell's long-distance telephone services. He also was a TV spokesman for AAMCO Transmissions in the 1980s and early 1990s, for Canadian Airlines in 1990, and for Office Depot in the 1990s.

He and his wife, Nancy Ross Landesberg, had a daughter, Elizabeth.

Death
Landesberg died from colon cancer on December 20, 2010, aged 74. He was cremated.

Age
Throughout his career, Landesberg was noncommittal about his age and year of birth. At the time of his death, many news outlets mistakenly reported his age as 65; some never corrected that story. In acknowledging that he was actually nine years older than he had long claimed, his daughter Elizabeth said he had provided varying birth dates over the years. "He got kind of a late start in show business," she explained, "so he tried to straddle the generations. He fooled the whole world. People were surprised to think he was even 65." Landesberg commented on the issue in a 1979 Washington Post profile for which he refused to give his age:

Partial filmography
Bewitched, Season 8, Episode 11: "The Warlock in the Grey Flannel Suit" (1971) - Beatnick
You've Got to Walk It Like You Talk It or You'll Lose That Beat (1971) - Men's Room Attendant
Blade (1973) - Debaum
Barney Miller (1975–1982, TV Series) - Det. Sgt. Arthur Dietrich / Father Paul
The Rockford Files, Season 3, Episode 12: "There's One in Every Port" (1977) - Kenny Hollywood
Leader of the Band (1987) - Eddie Layton
Doubles (1991) - George
Ladybugs (1992) - Dr. Von Kemp (uncredited)
Little Miss Millions (1993) - Harvey Lipschitz
Marsupilami (1993) - Eduardo (voice)
The Crazysitter (1994) - Detective Bristol
The Souler Opposite (1998) - Himself
Puppet (1999) - Charles
Gas (2004) - Sam
A Lousy 10 Grand (2004) - Prosecutor
Wild Hogs (2007) - Accountant
Forgetting Sarah Marshall (2008) - Dr. Rosenbaum
Everybody Hates Chris (2009, TV Series) - Mr. Levine

References

External links

Steve Landesberg at the Comedy Hall of Fame

1936 births
2010 deaths
20th-century American comedians
21st-century American comedians
21st-century American Jews
20th-century American male actors
21st-century American male actors
American male film actors
American male television actors
American male voice actors
Deaths from cancer in California
Deaths from colorectal cancer
Jewish American comedians
Jewish American male comedians
Jewish American male actors
Male actors from New York City
People from the Bronx